SteamHead is a non-profit organization whose stated goal is to "increase the presence of design in education". SteamHead claims inspiration from the Maker movement and S.T.E.A.M. education. Initiatives credited to SteamHead aim to help communities increase their capacity to "make". Activities are supported sponsors including the British Council, local charities, and schools. The organization supports local events including MakeFashion Edu and School Maker Faires.

It is based out of offices in the United States and a makerspace in Shenzhen, China. Founded in 2014 as "the Make Club" inside an apartment, it is now in a public space and hosts meetings for the Shenzhen Maker Ed community.

Description 
Steam Head offers free space to the education community to exchange information, collaborate, and share. Cross-sections of teachers, students, parents, and educational industry professionals meet hackers, artists, DIY enthusiasts, and educational innovators.

Steam Head's main room contains public work tables, and is suited for groups of about a dozen people. The back of a space contains a 3D printer room, a media recording room, a tinker's kitchen, storage spaces, an outdoor balcony, and a resident room.

The space is equipped with equipment and materials suited to primary school classrooms including about a dozen sets of simple craft tools (scissors, saws, screwdrivers, measuring tapes, etc.), an electronics workbench, a screen printing station, power saws drills cutters, a projector, and printers. Member's also have access to additional equipment including 3D printers and a large scale drawing machine.

The core team (volunteers) meets monthly to discuss matters relevant to the space, like renovation projects and equipment purchases. There are multiple special interest groups, which meet more regularly and often spontaneously. The space is open every day, usually for 24 hours. Regular members can be thumbprinted for door access rights.

The space is on the 2nd floor of an early 2000s Shenzhen building, formerly a commercial floor but now with several spaces converted to loft apartments.

Annual Programs 

Make Fashion Edu: partnering with the Make Fashion team to bring fashion tech initiatives to K-12 students
 Nanshan School Maker Faire: partnering with SAIS, Shenzhen American International School, "giving young makers a platform to express themselves"
 STEAM Summer Camp: partnering with Moralture to host an annual summer camp focusing on design thinking and making

Reoccurring Programs 

 School Volunteers: Steam Head accepts donations and sends volunteers to local migrant schools to bring STEAM education to students and training to teachers
 R.ED Resident Educator Program: Education community members are invited to stay in the Shenzhen space for 1 month residencies
 After School Classes: Steam Head partners with Moralture to bring workshops to K-8 students

Members of the space also participate in local Maker Faires by running workshops and tours, and also send representatives to maker events around the world including Brazil, the U.K., Germany, and Canada.

History 
Steam Head makerspace's founding members Benjamin James Simpson, Carrie Leung, Luke Henderson, and Emma Cheung have established the space as a makerspace for Educational R&D. As one of the first maker education spaces in Shenzhen, China, SteamHead found its roots in 2011, organizing free language lessons for manufacturing workers in China's Fujian and Guangdong provinces.

In 2014 Shenzhen the organization began offering science and technology lessons to migrant children. In 2015, they partnered with Litchee Lab to create educational programs and workshops. By 2017 SteamHead had relocated and started a makerspace in Shenzhen, China.

References

External links 
 

Hackerspaces